Smithfield is a city in Cache County, Utah, United States. The population was 9,495 at the 2010 United States Census, with an estimated population of 12,025 in 2019. It is included in the Logan, Utah-Idaho Metropolitan Statistical Area, and is the second largest city in the area after Logan, the county seat. Smithfield is home to one public high school and three public elementary schools.

Geography

History

Originally known as "Summit Creek" (due to its location on that creek), Smithfield was founded in 1857 by brothers Robert and John Thornley and their cousin Seth Langton, who were sent north from Salt Lake City by LDS Church President Brigham Young to found a settlement on Summit Creek. After a preliminary scouting, Robert returned with his new wife Annie Brighton. The first winter was spent in a wagon box. By the next summer, with more settlers arriving, a small fort was built on the edge of the creek, one cabin of which remains. As the settlement grew, a bishop was named to lead the church congregation, and the town took his name. By 1917 the town had planted trees on both sides of its Main Street and had acquired a Carnegie library and a Rotary club. Dependent for many years on dairying, a Del Monte canning factory, and the sugar beet industry, the town is now essentially a bedroom community for Logan and its Utah State University.

Demographics

At the 2000 United States Census there were 7,261 people in 2,066 households, including 1,782 families, in the city. The racial makeup of the city was 95.23% White, 0.12% African American, 0.23% Native American, 0.48% Asian, 0.04% Pacific Islander, 2.82% from other races, and 1.06% from two or more races. Hispanic or Latino of any race were 5.04%.

Of the 2,066 households 53.2% had children under the age of 18 living with them, 78.5% were married couples living together, 6.1% had a female householder with no husband present, and 13.7% were non-families. 12.2% of households were one person and 6.8% were one person aged 65 or older. The average household size was 3.51 and the average family size was 3.85.

The age distribution was 37.8% under the age of 18, 12.1% from 18 to 24, 25.8% from 25 to 44, 16.2% from 45 to 64, and 8.0% 65 or older. The median age was 25 years. For every 100 females, there were 99.5 males. For every 100 females age 18 and over, there were 96.6 males.

The median household income was $47,745 and the median family income  was $49,828. Males had a median income of $35,708 versus $21,076 for females. The per capita income for the city was $14,933. About 4.5% of families and 6.2% of the population were below the poverty line, including 6.6% of those under age 18 and 8.0% of those age 65 or over.

Education

Elementary schools
 Birch Creek Elementary
 Summit Elementary
 Sunrise Elementary

High school
 Sky View High

Community facilities
 Birch Creek Golf Course (owned by Smithfield City)
 Smithfield Cemetery (owned by Smithfield City)
 Smithfield Public Library (owned by Smithfield City)

See also
 Schreiber Foods (cheese factory in town owned by this company)

References

External links

 City of Smithfield official website

Cities in Cache County, Utah
Cities in Utah
Logan metropolitan area
Populated places established in 1857
1857 establishments in Utah Territory